Darwin Peña Arce (born August 8, 1977 in Santa Cruz de la Sierra) is a Bolivian football midfielder who currently plays for Nacional Potosí in the Liga de Fútbol Profesional Boliviano.

Club career
His former clubs include San José, Bolívar, Oriente Petrolero, Blooming, The Strongest, Real Potosí and Aurora.

International career
Peña has been capped for the Bolivia national team in 12 games between 2001 and 2008 with only one goal scored. He was part of the national team during the 2007 Copa América. He represented his country in 3 FIFA World Cup qualification matches.

Honours

Club
 Bolívar (2)
 Liga de Fútbol Profesional Boliviano: 1996, 1997
 Oriente Petrolero (1)
 Liga de Fútbol Profesional Boliviano: 2004 (C)
 Blooming (1)
 Liga de Fútbol Profesional Boliviano: 2005 (A)
 Real Potosí (1)
 Liga de Fútbol Profesional Boliviano: 2007 (A)

References

External links
 
 
 
 

1977 births
Living people
Sportspeople from Santa Cruz de la Sierra
Association football midfielders
Bolivian footballers
Bolivia international footballers
Club Bolívar players
Club Real Potosí players
Oriente Petrolero players
Club Blooming players
Club San José players
The Strongest players
Club Aurora players
Nacional Potosí players
2007 Copa América players
Club Real Potosí managers